The Solution is the 22nd book in the Animorphs series, written by K.A. Applegate, published first on January 1, 1998, and then released in October 1998. The book is narrated by Rachel. It is the last book in the David trilogy.

Plot summary
After having a bizarre dream, Rachel is woken by Ax, who explains Jake's express orders to summon her. That decision bothers her, but her qualms are silenced when Ax breaks her the news of Tobias's probable death. Rachel is willing to do what Jake expected her to do. They first fly to the mall to try and help Jake, only to be ambushed by David in his lion morph.  Rachel escapes the attempt on her life, and David retreats. Later, Cassie arrives with her family to tend to Jake, who was injured in his fight with David at the end of the previous book, so Rachel and Ax decide that Jake will be all right in their hands. They fly to Marco's house. Ax tries to fly through his window, but is promptly knocked out by David disguising as Marco's morph. Rachel allows David to morph to golden eagle, and leads him on a chase through town. Rachel plans to lure him into the power lines, electrocuting him, but David outmaneuvers her and almost kills her. David is attacked by a hawk, which turns out to be Tobias, with David thinking that it is a natural red-tailed hawk.

Relieved that Tobias is alive, the Animorphs plan how to trap the traitor. At school, they're surprised, though, when David, in Marco's body, demands the Escafil device, the blue box, threatening to betray their identities to the Yeerks. Cassie realizes that David wants the Escafil device to ransom his parents from the Yeerks and tries to reason with him, telling him it won't make Visser Three give his parents back. However, her attempt is to no avail. Making no progress, David leaves, with Rachel in pursuit. In a secluded spot on the school grounds, Rachel tells him that even if David betrays them, she'd still have time to make short work of him and his parents before she would be silenced by the Yeerks. David tries to attack her, but she pins him down. Having made her threat, she releases him. Soon after, Rachel becomes enraged with the way Jake is manipulating her violent tendencies.

The Animorphs formulate one final attempt to doom the Yeerks' plan to make Controllers of some of the G8 leaders. They morph dolphins and travel to the shore of the Marriott resort. Then, they morph elephants and rhinoceroses, and ravage the resort huts in which the heads of state reside. They leave a screaming Visser Three in "Tony's" morph, and retreat into the ocean. The plan is a success, but they encounter David in orca morph. Here, David accuses Rachel of threatening to kill his family, and Rachel is hurt by her teammates' silence. After an exhausting battle, Cassie morphs into a humpback whale and drives David away.

Rachel collapses in her bed the next morning, but is almost immediately pestered by her sister, Jordan, wanting some comfort regarding Saddler's grave condition. Soon after, Rachel walks into the bathroom and is confronted by a seemingly invisible David. He challenges her to a personal war, which she accepts only when he threatens her mother and sisters the way that she had previously threatened his parents. Rachel then accuses Jake of not standing with her against David, and that Jake thinks she is a psychopath. At the hospital, the family visits their dying child, Jake and Rachel's cousin, Saddler. It becomes apparent, however, that he is far from dying and had somehow miraculously made a full recovery. Jake immediately suspects David. When the three of them are alone, "Saddler" confirms Jake's suspicions by revealing himself to be David in morph.  David mocks Rachel and Jake, once again demanding the Escafil device. Rachel and Jake reconcile, and then begin concocting a scheme to beat David at his own game.

The Animorphs meet in Cassie's family's barn and have a mock discussion about an Escafil device that breaks into smaller pieces, and Rachel pretends to have been morally defeated by David, being mocked by Marco the whole time. The whole discussion is really a farce put on for David's benefit, in case he is spying on them in morph from somewhere close by. They meet David at a Taco Bell, and agree to lead him to the Escafil device, allowing him to abuse Rachel some more. Rachel and David fly to the abandoned construction site, with the other Animorphs following close behind. David traps the Animorphs as cockroaches in a Pepsi bottle, and he and Rachel morph into rats. They venture into the pipes to retrieve each "piece." David soon figures out the Animorphs' elaborate trap, though, and Rachel tries to escape, barely doing so. The instant she escapes, a cage door is dropped, trapping David. Tobias swoops down and reveals to David that he is, in fact, still alive and freed the other Animorphs from the bottle. Cassie had plotted out all of David's emotions, gauged his inflating ego, and knew the sociopath would select Rachel as his victim.

Although Rachel and the others do not want to do it, especially due to the incredible level of cruelty behind it, they decide to let David be trapped forever as a rat. Rachel and Ax stay behind, Rachel doing so because she says David's anguish won't bother her (even though it does), and Ax so he can keep track of time and make sure David remains trapped as a rat. Rachel and Ax carry David out to a desolate rocky outcrop a mile offshore (which Rachel had first glimpsed the night they stormed the Marriott resort beach), and leave him, his pleading and cursing trailing behind them.

Morphs

Contributions to the series' story arc
David is trapped in rat morph.
Rachel realizes that she possesses violent tendencies beyond a simple love of excitement, and that Jake is disturbed and concerned.

Inconsistencies
In her narration early in the book, Rachel only lists Russia, Britain, Japan, France, and the United States as the countries whose leaders were at the Marriott, but leaves out Germany.  Later on, she also mentions five leaders being housed on the resort, when there should actually be a mention of six.  This is likely an accidental authorial omission by Applegate.

Trivia
This is David's last appearance until his cameo in #41: The Familiar and his full return appearance in #48: The Return.
Though it was briefly assumed by fans that Saddler's death was because David had killed him, author K.A. Applegate has debunked this assumption, claiming that David had stuck to his code of never taking a human life and had simply acquired Saddler just before he had died of his injuries.  This was likely to give him some kind of redeeming quality.

References 

Animorphs books
1998 American novels
1998 science fiction novels